Shama Mohamed is an Indian politician belonging to Indian National Congress. She is a national media panelist  and spokesperson of All India Congress Committee.

Personal life 
Shama Mohamed was born on 17 May 1973 at Cherukallayi near New Mahe, Kannur district, Kerala. She completed her primary education from Indian School, Kuwait. She returned from Kuwait in 1990 and did her graduation in Bachelor of Dental Sciences from Yenepoya University, Mangalore. She has worked as a journalist in Zee TV for a brief period prior joining Indian National Congress in 2015. She is a passionate advocate of education for all, Women's rights., Primary healthcare, Population Control, Infrastructure and the plight of manual scavengers in India.
She is married and has two children.

Political career 
In Dec 2018, she was appointed as national media panelist of Indian National Congress. In July 2015, she was appointed as national spokesperson of All India Congress Committee. She has  come up in Kannur and Taliparamba constituencies. She  has said that the government's recent notification to regulate digital news platform is an attempt to suppress all social media platforms including digital news platforms.

See also 
 Rahul Gandhi

References 

1973 births
Living people
Indian dentists
People from Mahe district
Women in Puducherry politics
Indian National Congress politicians from Puducherry